The Women's International Bowling Congress (WIBC) was an organization for women bowlers who played ten-pin bowling and was formed in 1916 as a counterpart to the American Bowling Congress (ABC). The WIBC was initially called the "Woman's National Bowling Association" (WNBA), before the Women's International Bowling Congress was formed.

In 2005, the WIBC merged with three other bowling organizations to form the United States Bowling Congress (USBC): the American Bowling Congress, the Young American Bowling Alliance (YABA), and USA Bowling.

History

Founding of the WIBC
Originally called the Woman's National Bowling Association (WNBA), the Women's International Bowling Congress was formed in St. Louis, Missouri, in late November 1916. It was the first widely recognized women's association for the sport of ten-pin bowling.  The founding women were aided by male bowling alley proprietor (Washington Bowling Alleys in St. Louis) Dennis J. Sweeney, who obtained permission from the American Bowling Congress (ABC) in 1907 to hold a national women's tournament on their lanes, and held one in 1916, providing the inspiration.

The founding members of the WIBC were:
Catherine Menne, first WIBC president
Ellen Kelly, first WIBC secretary 
Mrs. L.W. Waldecker, first WIBC treasurer (quickly succeeded in 1917 by Cornelia Berghaus, who was elected after Waldecker resigned)

The first official meeting of the WNBA was held on October 26, 1917, in St. Louis. Forty women from 11 cities attended the meeting and voted on the organization's constitution, bylaws, and first 16-member executive committee. The purpose of the organization was agreed to be: To provide, adopt and enforce uniform rules and regulations governing the play of American tenpins; to provide and enforce uniform qualifications for tournaments and their participants; to hold a national tournament, and to encourage good feeling and create interest in the bowling game.

The WNBA held its first national tournament—today's USBC Queens event—in Cincinnati, Ohio, on March 11 – 12, 1918.

Past Presidents
1916 - Catherine Menne was a bowling pioneer. She was among the founders and served as the first president of the Women's National Bowling Association (later renamed the Women's International Bowling Congress or WIBC) in 1916.

WIBC Hall of Fame Inductees
1974 - Georgia Veatch served for more than 25 years on the Women's International Bowling Congress's board of directors. She also served as president of the Windy City Women's Bowling Association and president and secretary of the Chicago Bowling Council. Veatch was inducted into the Women's International Bowling Congress's Hall of Fame in 1974 for "meritorious service to bowling".

Membership
When it became a part of USBC in 2005, there were over 1.2 million WIBC members playing in 67,000 sanctioned leagues in over 2,700 local associations. Local associations exist in every state as well some foreign countries. The national tournament held by the WIBC, now called the USBC Women's Championships, is the largest women's sporting event in the world. The 1997 tournament in Reno, Nevada, attracted 14,872 five-woman teams (for a total of 88,279 participants), the largest entry for any team tournament in history and a women's world record.

See also
2005 in sports

References

Bowling organizations
Sports organizations established in 1917
Women's sports organizations
Organizations disestablished in 2005
1917 establishments in Missouri